Joe A Marsh is a South African international lawn bowler.

Bowls career
He was the Transvaal and Southern Transvaal bowls champion and was the South African National Bowls Championships runner-up in 1970.

He won a silver medal in the triples at the 1972 World Outdoor Bowls Championship in Worthing with Edgar Davey and Doug Watson. He also won a silver medal in the team event (Leonard Trophy).

Personal life
He was a gold refining official by trade and took up bowls in 1948.

References

1928 births
South African male bowls players
Possibly living people